Last Looks is a 2022 American-British mystery film, directed by Tim Kirkby, from a screenplay by Howard Michael Gould based on his novel of the same name. It stars Charlie Hunnam, Mel Gibson, Morena Baccarin, Lucy Fry, Rupert Friend, Dominic Monaghan, Jacob Scipio and Clancy Brown.

Premise
Last Looks is based on the 2018 crime-mystery novel of the same name, the first book in the Charlie Waldo series written by Gould. The second book in the series, Below the Line, was published in August 2019.

According to The Hollywood Reporter,

Cast
 Charlie Hunnam as Charlie Waldo
 Mel Gibson as Alastair Pinch
 Morena Baccarin as Lorena Nascimento 
 Lucy Fry as Jayne White
 Rupert Friend as Wilson Sikorsky
 Dominic Monaghan as Warren Gomes
 Jacob Scipio as Don Q
 Clancy Brown as Big Jim Cuppy
 Paul Ben-Victor as Lieutenant Pete Conady
 Method Man as Swag Dogggg
 David Pasquesi as Darius Jamshidi
 Robin Givens as Fontella Davis
 Josh McDermitt as Director
 Steve Coulter as Dr. Sebastian Hexter
 Deacon Randle as Nini
 Rachel Hendrix as Valerie
 David Michael-Smith as Bailiff Canavan
 Xen Sams as Allie Jamshidi

Production
In October 2018, Charlie Hunnam, Mel Gibson and Eiza González joined the cast of the film, then titled Waldo, with Tim Kirkby directing from a screenplay by Howard Michael Gould. In June 2019, Jacob Scipio, Dominic Monaghan, Clancy Brown, Morena Baccarin, and Paul Ben-Victor joined the cast of the film. In July 2019, Lucy Fry joined the cast of the film. In August 2019, Rupert Friend and Method Man joined the cast of the film. The film was retitled from Waldo to Last Looks in June 2020. In December 2021, RLJE Films acquired North American rights to the film and set it for a February 2022 release.

Principal photography began in Atlanta on June 18, 2019.

Release
Last Looks was released on February 4, 2022.

Reception

References

External links
 
 

2022 action comedy films
2022 action thriller films
2020s American films
2020s British films
2020s English-language films
American action comedy films
American action thriller films
American comedy thriller films
American detective films
British action comedy films
British action thriller films
British comedy thriller films
British detective films
American comedy mystery films
British comedy mystery films
Films based on American crime novels
Films shot in Atlanta